Hari Dhillon is an American television, film and stage actor, best known for playing Michael Spence in British television medical drama series Holby City. His name has also been spelled Hari Dillon and Harry Dillon.

Early life and education
Dillon was born and raised in San Francisco, California. He spent nine months of his childhood in India. He took one acting class at UC Berkeley in his senior year at San Francisco State University. After graduation, he worked as a prison AIDS educator in California and Hawaii before setting up a theatre company in San Francisco with friends. In 1994, he attended drama school in the United Kingdom.

Career
Dillon originally appeared in Holby City in 2001 as recurring minor character Dr. Sunil Gupta, before returning in November 2007 as consultant Michael Spence. Dhillon took an 'extended break' from Holby City on December 17, 2013, after Michael was forced to leave his post by new CEO, Guy Self (John Michie).

On June 19, 2014, it was announced Dhillon would be returning to Holby City as Michael for a short stint in late 2014. During this time, Dhillon also starred alongside Amanda Mealing on Casualty.

His appearances in US TV shows include Medium, Charmed, Without a Trace, The Loop, and Law & Order: Special Victims Unit.
He also had minor, unnamed roles in the films Cradle 2 the Grave, Wit and Entrapment. He also starred in the Broadway debut of the Ayad Akhtar play, Disgraced.

Television

Film
Entrapment (1999)
New World Disorder (1999)
Wit (2001)
Cradle 2 the Grave (2003)
Bad Education (2019)
Doom: Annihilation (2019)

Theatre
 Mother Teresa Is Dead (2002), Royal Court Theatre, London
 Drifting Elegant (2004), Magic Theatre, San Francisco 
 A Perfect Wedding (2004), Kirk Douglas Theatre, Los Angeles 
 Morbidity and Mortality (2006), Magic Theatre, San Francisco
 Charles L. Mee's A Perfect Wedding, which was the inaugural production of the Kirk Douglas Theatre in Los Angeles
 Original production of Stephen Belber's Drifting Elegant at San Francisco's Magic Theatre, which was later developed into a feature film
 Broadway debut of the Ayad Akhtar play, Disgraced.

Awards and nominations
Dhillon was nominated to the long-list of the 2010 National Television Awards in the category for "Best Drama Performance".

References

External links

American male television actors
American male film actors
American male stage actors
American male actors of Indian descent
American expatriate male actors in the United Kingdom
Living people
1968 births
San Francisco State University alumni
American expatriates in India